Francesca Tardioli (8 September 1965 – 20 February 2022) was an Italian diplomat. She served as Ambassador of Italy to Australia from 2019 to 2022.

Biography
Tardioli was born in Foligno, Umbria and graduated from the University of Perugia with a degree in political science. In 1991, she joined the Ministry of Foreign Affairs. From November 1995 to August 1998, she was consul in Nuremberg. Later, from September 2004 to July 2008, she was Permanent Representative of NATO.

Tardioli died after falling from a balcony at her home in Foligno on 20 February 2022, at the age of 56.

Honours

National honours
  4th Class / Officer: Order of Merit of the Italian Republic: 3 June 2021

References

1965 births
2022 deaths
People from Foligno

20th-century diplomats
21st-century diplomats
Italian women ambassadors
Italian women diplomats
Ambassadors of Italy to Australia
University of Perugia alumni
Accidental deaths from falls
Accidental deaths in Italy